Alejandro Almada (born 5 January 1990) is an Argentine professional footballer who plays as a midfielder for Atlético Paraná.

Career
Almada's career started in 2008 with Salto Grande in Torneo Argentino C. Two years later, in 2010, Colegiales of Torneo Argentino B signed Almada. He scored once in fourteen appearances during 2010–11, prior to departing at the conclusion of the season to play in Primera D for Deportivo Riestra. However, he left soon after following just four appearances. A season-long spell with Sportivo Las Heras arrived, before Almada joined Primera B Nacional side Patronato in August 2012. He made his professional career debut on 20 August during a 3–5 home defeat versus Crucero del Norte.

In total, he made thirty-six appearances in his opening two campaigns with Patronato. He subsequently only featured thirteen times in the next four campaigns, with most of his time spent out on loan to Torneo Federal B clubs; in 2015 and 2016 to Libertad, in 2016 (C) to Santa María de Oro. After nineteen matches for the aforementioned teams, Almada departed Patronato permanently in July 2017 by signing for Torneo Federal A's San Jorge. His debut came on 17 September against Juventud Antoniana. 2020 saw Almada join Atlético Paraná in the Torneo Regional Federal Amateur.

Career statistics
.

References

External links

1990 births
Living people
People from Paraná, Entre Ríos
Argentine footballers
Association football midfielders
Torneo Argentino C players
Torneo Argentino B players
Primera D Metropolitana players
Primera Nacional players
Argentine Primera División players
Torneo Federal A players
Deportivo Riestra players
Club Atlético Patronato footballers
San Jorge de Tucumán footballers
Club Atlético Paraná players
Sportspeople from Entre Ríos Province